Naga Panchami is a 1956 Indian Tamil language film produced and directed by K. Nagabushanam. The film stars Anjali Devi, S. Varalakshmi and Chittor V. Nagayya.

Cast
The list is adapted from the database of Film News Anandan
Anjali Devi
S. Varalakshmi
Chittor V. Nagayya
K. A. Thangavelu
P. Kannamba

Production
While Kannamba was producing this film in Tamil, AVM produced the same story in Kannada with the title Naga Devatha. They dubbed that film into Tamil and released with the title Naga Devathai before Kannamba released her film. Therefore, Kannamba's film Naga Panchami was a flop. So, Kannamba dubbed that film into Telugu and released.

Soundtrack
The lyrics were penned by S. D. S. Yogi, Nagai Mani and V. Seetharaman. Music composer is not known.

References

External links